Miguel Ángel Granados Chapa (March 10, 1941 – October 16, 2011) was a Mexican journalist writing for the Reforma newspaper. He was the recipient of the Premio Nacional de Periodismo in 2004 for his career, and again in 2006 for his column. He won the Pedro María Anaya medal in 2008 (an award given by the congress of Hidalgo), and the Belisario Domínguez Medal of Honor in 2008.

Biography
Born in Mineral del Monte, Hidalgo, on March 10, 1941, he studied both law and journalism in the UNAM, and obtained a doctorate in History at the Universidad Iberoamericana.

He worked as editorial assistant director for Excélsior, director for Proceso, director for La Jornada, councilman for the Federal Electoral Institute (IFE), and ran for governor of Hidalgo in 1999.

He was the author of several books and had a column in the Reforma newspaper called "Plaza Pública", and a radio show with the same name on Radio UNAM.

Death
In his last contribution to Reforma's "Plaza Pública", Granados Chapa said goodbye to his readers with the statement: "This is the last time we meet. With this conviction, I say goodbye". He died in Mexico City on October 16, 2011.

References

External links
Medalla Belisario Dominguez
Conviven los Distintos
Entregarán medalla Belisario Domínguez a Granados Chapa
 Fallece el periodista Miguel Ángel Granados Chapa

1941 births
2011 deaths
Mexican journalists
Male journalists